Andriivka or Andriyivka may refer to several places in Ukraine:

Donetsk Oblast
 Andriivka, Bakhmut Raion, Donetsk Oblast
 Andriivka, Horlivka Raion, Donetsk Oblast
 Andriivka (urban-type settlement), Kramatorsk Raion, Donetsk Oblast
 Andriivka (village), Kramatorsk Raion, Donetsk Oblast
 Andriivka, Myrne settlement hromada, Volnovakha Raion, Donetsk Oblast
 Andriivka, Velyka Novosilka settlement hromada, Volnovakha Raion, Donetsk Oblast

Lviv Oblast
 Andriivka, Chervonohrad Raion, Lviv Oblast
 Andriivka, Zolochiv Raion, Lviv Oblast

Poltava Oblast
 Andriivka, Lubny Raion, Poltava Oblast
 Andriivka, Dykanka settlement hromada, Poltava Raion, Poltava Oblast
 Andriivka, Khorol urban hromada, Poltava Raion, Poltava Oblast
 Andriivka, Mykhailivka rural hromada, Poltava Raion, Poltava Oblast
 Andriivka, Nekhvoroshcha rural hromada, Poltava Raion, Poltava Oblast
 Andriivka, Poltava urban hromada, Poltava Raion, Poltava Oblast

Elsewhere
 Andriivka, Kharkiv Oblast (Izium Raion)
 
 Andriivka, Vyshhorod Raion